Ixcatlán Mazatec is a Mazatecan language spoken in the Mexican state of Oaxaca, notably in the towns of Chichicazapa, Nuevo Ixcatlán, and San Pedro Ixcatlán. Egland (1978) found 76% intelligibility with Huautla, the prestige variety of Mazatec.

See also
Mazatecan languages

References

Mazatecan languages